Rahner may refer to:

 Helmut Rahner (born 1971), German soccer player
 Hugo Rahner (1900–1968), German Jesuit theologian
 Karl Rahner (1904–1984), German Jesuit theologian
 Raymond M. Rahner, better known as Ray Rayner (1919–2004), American television presenter
 Wilhelmina Beatrice Rahner, better known as Bess Houdini (1876–1943), stage assistant and wife of Harry Houdini

See also
 Rayner

German-language surnames